Ciaotou District is a rural district in Kaohsiung City, Taiwan.

History

Empire of Japan
During the Japanese era, modern-day Gangshan District and Ciaotou were administered under Okayama Town , Okayama District, Takao Prefecture.

Republic of China
After the handover of Taiwan from Japan to the Republic of China in 1945, Ciaotou was organized as a rural township of Kaohsiung County. On 25 December 2010, Kaohsiung County was merged with Kaohsiung City and Ciaotou was upgraded to a district of the city.

Geography
Ciaotou has a land area of 25.9379 square kilometers, or 10.0147 square miles. It has 40,551 inhabitants as of January 2023, and belongs to the Kaohsiung metropolitan area. It is the 18th most populated district in Kaohsiung.

Administrative divisions
The district consists of Qiaotou, Qiaonan, Shilong, Shifeng, Yuliao, Tunglin, Xilin, Baishu, Bixiu, Xinzhuang, Jiabei, Jianan, Dingyan, Zhongqi, Shihe, Desong and Sande Village.

Politics
The district is part of Kaohsiung City Constituency II electoral district for Legislative Yuan.

Tourist attractions 
 1114 Memorial Park
 Bamboo Grove Park
 Qiaotou Fengqiao Temple (橋頭鳳橋宮)
 Jioujiawei Yishan Temple (九甲圍義山宮)
 Ciaotou Night Market (橋頭夜市)
 Ciaotou Old Street (橋頭老街)
 Kaohsiung Metropolitan Park
 Shueiliou Village
 Taiwan Sugar Museum
 Three Kings Temple (三山國王廟)

Transportation

Ciaotou is served by the Ciaotou, Ciaotou Sugar Refinery, and Cingpu stations of the Kaohsiung Metro. The Ciaotou metro station can also connect to the Western Trunk line of the Taiwan Railways Administration.

Ciaotou is also served by Provincial Highways 1 and 17.

Notable natives
 Tai Chen-yao, Vice Minister of Council of Agriculture (2003-2005)

See also
 Kaohsiung

References

External links 

 

Districts of Kaohsiung